The 2008 Utah Utes football team represented the University of Utah in the 2008 NCAA Division I FBS football season. The team, coached by 4th year head football coach Kyle Whittingham, plays its home games in Rice-Eccles Stadium.  Utah was one of only two teams in the top-level Division I FBS to finish the regular season undefeated (the other being the Boise State Broncos), but after the Broncos were defeated by TCU in the Poinsettia Bowl and Utah won the Sugar Bowl over Alabama, the Utes finished as the nation's only undefeated team. It was the fifth undefeated and untied season in school history. During the 2008-2009 season, Utah defeated 4 teams that were ranked in the AP's final poll: #6 Alabama, #7 TCU, #18 Oregon State, and #25 BYU. Utah also began the season by defeating the Michigan Wolverines—ranked #24 at the time—in Ann Arbor. This resume propelled Utah to finish the season ranked #1 in four out of the six BCS computer models: Sagarin (Elo-Chess), Peter Wolfe, Anderson & Hester, and Massey.

Utah received championship recognition from NCAA-designated major selector Anderson & Hester. This designation is also recognized by Pac 12 record books. Kyle Whittingham received multiple coach of the year awards including from the Mountain West Conference, AFCA, and the Paul "Bear" Bryant Award.

Schedule

Rankings

Preseason

Recruiting

Game summaries

Michigan

Series Tied: 1 – 1 – 0

Utah fans went to the Big House hoping for a better outcome  than the last time the Utes visited Michigan Stadium, which resulted in a 10–7 loss in 2002.  New Michigan coach Rich Rodriguez's offense was new to a Michigan squad built to run a smashmouth offense and was slow to get things going against the Ute defense, and the experienced Michigan defense prevented the Utah offense from gaining momentum. After a slow start for both teams, the Ute offense scored finally started clicking and scored sixteen points in the 2nd quarter taking a 22–10 lead into half-time. The offense wouldn't be able to do much the rest of the game. In the 2nd half it was more of the same from the 1st quarter, the only score coming off of a 53-yard field-goal from Louie Sakoda to put the Utes up 25–10. Michigan scored on the first play of their 2nd possession of the 4th quarter with a 33-yard touchdown pass by Steven Threet to Junior Hemingway, inching closer to the Utah lead. Only two minutes later Michigan RB Sam Mcguffie ran into the endzone from three yards out bringing the Wolverines to within two points, but failed on the ensuing two-point conversion. Utah was able to run out most of the clock before turning the ball over on downs to the Wolverines who were unable to score before time expired, giving the Utes their first win of the season and improving Kyle Whittingham's record against BCS opponents to 5–3.

UNLV

Utah Leads Series: 12 – 2 – 0

After an emotional win against Michigan in the season opener, UNLV provided the perfect opponent for Utah to avoid having a "let-down" game as the Rebels embarrassed Utah in Las Vegas the year before, winning 27–0 in one of the most troublesome losses in Utah history. Things did not start off well as UNLV, behind the running of Frank Summers, took first half-leads of 7–0 and 14–7.

But shortly before halftime, quarterback Brian Johnson led the Utes on an eighty-yard drive that tied the game going into halftime, and Utah scored on its first four possessions of the second half to turn the game into a rout. Six different Utah players scored touchdowns, and both Johnson and running back Matt Asiata ran and threw for a touchdown.

Utah State

Utah Leads Series: 76 – 28 – 4

Even though Utah faced an early 7–0 deficit, this game was never close. Utah scored the game's next thirty points and Matt Asiata tacked on a pair of second-half touchdowns to finish with three rushing TDs as the Utes won going away. Utah State finished with just 116 yards of total offense, and 57 of those came on its final drive of the game against Utah's reserves. Both of Utah State's scoring drives came on short fields caused by turnovers.

Air Force

Air Force Leads Series: 14 – 11 – 0

Despite outgaining the Falcons 440-191 and holding Air Force's vaunted option attack to a 30-year low of 53 yards rushing, Utah needed to put together an 11-play, 80-yard drive capped by Darrell Mack's third rushing touchdown with 58 seconds remaining to win.

Offensively, Utah dug itself a hole after building a 9–0 lead. Johnson threw an interception in the end zone and had a second-quarter fumble returned for another touchdown to give Air Force a 16–9 halftime lead. But a ground-heavy attack helped Utah tie the game early in the second half and Air Force never threatened again to take the lead. Mack finished with 101 yards and three scores on 18 carries, while Asiata finished with 116 yards on 19 carries.

Weber State

Utah Leads Series: 3 – 0 – 0

With a game in just five days against Oregon State—fresh off an upset victory over then-No. 1 Southern California, the Utes did enough to decide the outcome early. Utah rolled up 450 yards of total offense to take a 37–7 lead early in the fourth quarter before the Wildcats—coached by former Utah head coach Ron McBride and a member of the Football Championship Subdivision—scored twice late to make the final score respectable. With 13 points on three field goals and four extra points, Utah kicker Louie Sakoda became the all-time leading scorer in school history.

Oregon State

Oregon State Leads Series: 9 – 5 – 1

Utah scored 11 points in the final 1:29 to escape with a victory. Utah trailed 9–3 early in the second quarter before finishing off the half with a Louie Sakoda 28-yard field goal and touchdowns of 14 yards from Brian Johnson to Freddie Brown and a 12-yard run by Brent Casteel to take a 20–9 halftime lead. Oregon State reeled off 19 straight points of its own to take a 28–20 lead with 2:18 left to play. In a departure from conventional football strategy, Oregon State had elected twice to go for two points after its first two touchdowns of the half (its PAT after the first touchdown was blocked, resulting in coach Mike Riley to "chase points" by going for 2) instead of kicking extra points.

Had it kicked extra points, Oregon State would have led 30–20. But Johnson lead a 4-play, 60-yard drive capped by a 25-yard scoring pass to Bradon Godfrey, then rushed for the 2-point conversion to tie the game, but only after Oregon State was whistled for pass interference on Utah's first two-point try.

Oregon State then threw incomplete on first down, ran out of bounds to stop the clock on second down (another time-honored no-no in football at that stage of the game) and threw incomplete on third down. After a 31-yard punt, Oregon State had used up just 23 seconds, which left plenty of time for a game-winning drive. Johnson threw for 7, 8 and 16 yards to get the Utes into Sakoda's range, and his 37-yard field goal as time expired was good.

Wyoming

Utah Leads Series: 49 – 31 – 1

Sean Smith picked off a deflected pass on Wyoming's second possession and returned it 25 yards for a score—one of two interceptions on the day for the all-Mountain West Conference cornerback. After a pair of Louie Sakoda field goals made the score 13–0, Aiona Key blocked a Wyoming punt and returned it 6 yards for a touchdown. Matt Asiata added a rushing and receiving touchdown to give Utah a 34–0 lead, and RJ Rice's recovery of a muffed punt in the end zone accounted for the final score.

Colorado State

Utah Leads Series: 53 – 22 – 2

For the first time all season, Utah used a variety of big plays on offense to bury the improved Rams. Brian Johnson threw touchdowns of 32 and 33 yards to Freddie Brown and David Reed and backup quarterback Corbin Louks ran for scores of 21 and 69 yards. Wide receiver Jereme Brooks ran 34 yards for another score as Utah piled up 549 yards of total offense, 327 on the ground.

New Mexico

Utah Leads Series: 31 – 17 – 2

The Lobos had marred great Utah seasons before, most notably in 1994 when it beat an undefeated Utes team ranked #8 in the country for their first loss and handing the 2003 MWC champions its only conference loss (and one of two all year) in a lopsided win at Rice-Eccles Stadium. New Mexico almost did it again, but the special teams rose to the occasion for the Utes as Key blocked a first-half field goal attempt and Louie Sakoda repeatedly pinned the Lobos deep with well-placed punts. His last put the Lobos at their own 1 with 1:58 left, and the Lobos, with no timeouts, could only get to the Utah 46 before time expired. Sakoda kicked a pair of field goals and Casteel's 10-yard catch from Brian Johnson gave Utah a 13–3 lead late in the third quarter, a lead which ultimately held up.

TCU

Utah Leads Series: 5 – 1 – 0

This game was advertised as a "Blackout". The Utes wore black uniforms for the first time in school history and the fans responded by turning Rice-Eccles Stadium into a sea of black. None of it fazed TCU, which went 64 and 72 yards on its first two possessions to take a quick 10–0 lead. Louie Sakoda's 49-yard field goal with 2:37 left in the first quarter got Utah on the board, and Smith's interception right before half time helped set up another Sakoda field goal, this one from 37 yards.

TCU's defense, coupled with some untimely playcalling by Utah, made the Frogs' 10–6 lead stand up deep into the fourth quarter. But TCU kicker Ross Evans missed two field goals—the first off the left upright, the second wide right, giving Utah one final shot at salvaging frontrunner status in the MWC and for a BCS bid as it took over on its own 20 with 2:48 left. Completions of 5 and 7 yards got Utah a first down, then Brian Johnson connected with Casteel for a 22-yard strike to get into TCU territory.

A pass interference call moved the ball to the TCU 31, where Utah faced its most crucial point of the season. Facing 4th and 5 after a pair of incompletions and a 5-yard pass to Godfrey, Johnson beat the blitz and found Brown for an 11-yard gain to the TCU 15. Another pass to Godfrey put the ball at the TCU 9, and Johnson found Brown on a slant pattern for the winning touchdown on the next play. Versus commentators Tommy Hart and Dan Fouts gave a memorable account of the crowd noise after the touchdown:

Hart: This is a well-built stadium. This press box is shaking right now.

Fouts: Oh good, I thought it was my knees. You get a little excited when you see a great 80-yard drive engineered by Brian Johnson ... 7 of 9 on that drive and the capper, finding Freddie Brown downtown.

TCU would get the ball back with one more shot to get into field goal range—and for Evans to redeem himself for his two previous misses. But Andy Dalton, on 4th and 10 with just seconds to go, was intercepted on a deep pass by Robert Johnson at the Utah 15 to end the game.

San Diego State

Utah Leads Series: 15 – 12 – 1

Brian Johnson had an excellent performance as Utah tuned up for the following week's showdown with BYU by throwing five first-half touchdowns, completing 27 of 38 passes for 283 yards as the Utes were in control the entire game. Backup safety Deshawn Richard would return two passes 89 and 36 yards for touchdowns in the final quarter to put an exclamation point on the Utes' rout of the Aztecs.

Brigham Young

Utah Leads Series: 53 – 33 – 4
Utah forced six turnovers and BYU forced none, turning what was otherwise a close game statistically into a blowout. Brian Johnson won his matchup against his highly touted counterpart, Max Hall, completing 30 of 36 passes for 303 yards and four touchdowns, while Hall went 21-41-205 with no touchdowns and five interceptions, in addition to losing a fumble.

Johnson was sharp early, leading Utah to points on its first three possessions for a 17–3 lead. But BYU fought back to tie the game. Louie Sakoda's 35-yard field goal with 1:41 left in the first half gave Utah a 20–17 lead before Hall started padding his interceptions stats with an ill-timed throw to Joe Dale. On the same play, Hall was whistled for unsportsmanlike conduct, giving Utah the ball at the BYU 44. Two plays resulted in a first down before Johnson found David Reed for a 32-yard strike in the corner of the end zone for a 27–17 halftime lead.

Hall did rush 11 yards for a touchdown with 6:46 left in the third quarter to get BYU within 27–24, but that would be the last time he would star in a highlight that helped his team. BYU's final five possessions ended interception, fumble, interception, interception, interception.

Starting with the fumble, Utah scored touchdowns on three straight possessions. Three plays into the fourth quarter, Casteel caught a pass in the flat and ran 8 yards for a touchdown and a 34–24 lead. Utah all but clinched a BCS bid and the outright MWC crown with its next interception when Paul Kruger floated off his defensive end position and into pass coverage. Hall never saw the sophomore lurking in the flat, and only a desperate swipe by Hall kept Kruger from returning the interception for a touchdown. On the next play, Asiata took the direct snap, ran forward two steps and threw a jump pass to Chris Joppru in the back of the end zone for a 41–24 lead with 12 minutes left in the game. Smith's fifth interception of the year helped Johnson cap his day with a 1-yard scoring pass to tight end Colt Sampson, and for the third time this season Utah fans rushed the field after a victory against a ranked team.

Sugar Bowl: Utah vs. Alabama

Utah Leads Series: 1 – 0 – 0

Utah, 9½ point underdogs entering the game, treated the Superdome crowd of 71,872 to an offensive explosion in the first quarter and a dominant defense in beating fourth-ranked Alabama to cap a perfect 13–0 season—the second undefeated season in five years for the Utes.

Alabama picked up one first down on its opening drive, but a third-down sack of quarterback John Parker Wilson by Stevenson Sylvester—the first of three for the junior linebacker—ended the threat. Utah immediately went to work on offense as quarterback Brian Johnson completed all five of his passes to five different receivers, the touchdown pass coming on a 7-yarder to Casteel.

The Tide's poor start continued as Wilson was intercepted by Robert Johnson on the second play of the ensuing drive. Starting from the Alabama 32, Brian Johnson connected with David Reed on a 30-yard pass to the Alabama 2, and Asiata took it in two plays later for a score out of the "Wildcat" formation for a 14–0 lead.

Kepa Gaison ended Alabama's third drive with another sack, and Brian Johnson quickly fired up the Ute attack, completing 5 of 7 passes for 50 yards, drawing a pass interference penalty on Alabama and running another 9 yards for a first down on 3rd-and-4 from midfield. Bradon Godfrey capped the drive with an 18-yard touchdown reception, and Utah led 21–0 just 11 minutes into the game.

Alabama rallied, scoring 17 straight points on Leigh Tiffin's 52-yard field goal and Javier Arenas' 73-yard punt return in the second quarter, and Glenn Coffee's 4-yard touchdown catch off a short field caused by a Brian Johnson fumble to start the third quarter.

But as it had done against Air Force, Oregon State and TCU, the Utah offense responded when it had to. Brian Johnson's first pass of the ensuing drive went to Brown for 33 yards, and Godfrey gained 10 on 3rd-and-10 to keep the drive alive. Facing 3rd-and-10 at the Alabama 28, Johnson threw into the left flat for Reed, who slipped a tackle and went into the end zone untouched for a 28–17 lead.

The Utah defense dominated from there, sacking Wilson four more times (Utah finished with eight sacks; Alabama had given up 13 all season entering the game), forcing a Wilson fumble that Utah recovered and turned into the final points, a 28-yard field goal by Louie Sakoda, and a second interception. Alabama crossed midfield just once after the Reed touchdown, and never got any further than the Utah 32.

The final box score revealed an unexpected advantage for Utah. Alabama's run game, which ranked 22nd nationally at 196 yards per game entering the contest, was held to 31 yards on 33 carries. Alabama had given up only 27 first-quarter points and one first-quarter touchdown all season long; against Utah it gave up 21 and three, respectively.

Alabama's secondary was 13th nationally in pass efficiency defense at 101.63, but Johnson's passer rating for this game was 158.84. Johnson finished 27 of 41 for 336 yards and three TDs—all of which were the most yards, completions and TDs the Tide had given up to a single quarterback all season long.

The victory marked Utah's eighth consecutive bowl victory—the longest active streak in the country—and was the program's first victory against an SEC school in seven tries. It also became the first program in the BCS era to finish a season undefeated twice, joining the 2004 team.

Utah's poll finish

The effects of this game were monumental. Immediately, on sports internet site polls and in newspaper columns, the Utes' case for a share of the national championship was made. Among the noteworthy members of the press to chime in were Rick Reilly of ESPN The Magazine and John Feinstein of The Washington Post.

In the end, sixteen AP voters went against the result of the BCS title game and voted Utah No. 1. It was not enough to offset Florida's forty-eight first-place votes, but Utah still finished a comfortable No. 2, surpassing its No. 4 finish in the 2004 season for its highest ranking ever. Utah also placed ahead of two teams which won their BCS bowl games—traditional powers Southern California and Texas, both of whom entered the bowl season ranked ahead of Utah. USC earned one first-place vote, but finished No. 3.

In the coaches poll, Utah finished fourth and earned one first-place vote courtesy of head coach Kyle Whittingham, who vowed after the Sugar Bowl to vote Utah No. 1—despite his obligations as a member of the American Football Coaches Association to vote the winner of the BCS title game in the top spot.

The computers which make up the BCS standings told a different story. Utah was ranked first in four of the six BCS computer models: Sagarin (Elo-Chess), Peter Wolfe, Anderson & Hester and Massey. Utah finished third in the Colley Matrix and Richard Billingsley rankings. Florida didn't finish lower than second in any of the computer rankings, but earned only two first-place finishes amongst the computers.

The Anderson & Hester poll, an NCAA-designated major selector, selected Utah as its national champion.

Depth chart
These are the projected starters and primary backups as of November 2008.

Season Statistics
2008 Official Stats

Team

Individual Leaders

After the season

NFL draft
The Utes had four players go in the 2009 NFL Draft:

See also
 List of undefeated NCAA Division I football teams

References

Utah
Utah Utes football seasons
Mountain West Conference football champion seasons
Sugar Bowl champion seasons
College football undefeated seasons
Utah Utes football